Janet Kauffman (born June 10, 1945) is an American novelist, poet, and mixed media artist.

Biography
Kauffman was born in Lancaster, Pennsylvania.  She taught in the English Department at Eastern Michigan University (EMU) in Ypsilanti, Michigan from 1988 until her retirement in 2008. She received her PhD from University of Chicago in 1972.

Bibliography

Poetry 
Collections
 Writing Home, with Jerome McGann (Coldwater Press, 1978)
 The Weather Book (Texas Tech University Press, 1981)
 Where the World Is (Montparnasse Press, 1988)
 Five on Fiction (Burning Deck Press, 2004)
 oh corporeal (Coldwater Press, 2010)

Novels
 Collaborators (Knopf, 1986)
 The Body in Four Parts (Graywolf, 1994)
 Rot (New Issues, 2001)

Short fiction 
Collections
 Places in the World a Woman Could Walk  (Knopf, 1983)
 Obscene Gestures for Women (Knopf, 1989)
 Characters on the Loose (Graywolf, 1997)
 Trespassing: Dirt Stories & Field Notes (stories and essays) (Wayne State University Press, 2008)
Stories

References

Sources
BookRags

External links
 http://www.janetkauffman.com

1945 births
Living people
Mixed-media artists
American women novelists
American women poets
Artists from Michigan
Artists from Pennsylvania
Eastern Michigan University faculty
Writers from Lancaster, Pennsylvania
American Mennonites
Mennonite writers
University of Chicago alumni
Novelists from Michigan
20th-century American novelists
20th-century American women writers
20th-century American poets
PEN/Faulkner Award for Fiction winners
Novelists from Pennsylvania
American women academics
21st-century American women